Arthur Ashe and Robert Lutz were the defending champions, but Ashe did not participate this year.  Lutz partnered Stan Smith, losing in the semifinals.

Brian Gottfried and Dick Stockton won the title, defeating Roy Emerson and Rod Laver 4–6, 6–3, 6–4 in the final.

Seeds

  Roy Emerson /  Rod Laver (final)
  Nikola Pilić /  Allan Stone (quarterfinals)
  Terry Addison /  Colin Dibley (quarterfinals)
  Ove Nils Bengtson /  Jim McManus (first round)
  Robert Maud /  Andrew Pattison (semifinals)
  Brian Gottfried /  Dick Stockton (champions)

Draw

Draw

External links
 Draw

U.S. Pro Indoor
1973 Grand Prix (tennis)